Wang Jingxia  is a Chinese football player. She was part of the Chinese team at the 1999 FIFA Women's World Cup.

References

1976 births
Living people
Chinese women's footballers
Asian Games medalists in football
1999 FIFA Women's World Cup players
China women's international footballers
Women's association football defenders
Medalists at the 1998 Asian Games
Asian Games gold medalists for China
Footballers at the 1998 Asian Games